American Restoration is an American reality television series airing on the History channel. Produced by Leftfield Pictures, the series is filmed in Las Vegas, Nevada, where it chronicles the daily activities at Rick's Restorations, an antique restoration store, with its owner Rick Dale, his staff, and teenage son, as they restore various vintage items to their original condition.

The show is the first spin-off of Pawn Stars, in which Dale has appeared several times as an on-camera expert and has restored various items. The series has featured cameo appearances by the cast of Pawn Stars, American Pickers, magician Lance Burton, and NASCAR driver Greg Biffle.

Series overview

Episodes

Season 1 (2010)

Season 2 (2011)

Season 3 (2012–13)

Season 4 (2013)

Christmas special (2013)

Season 5 (2014)

Season 6 (2014)

Season 7 (2016)

References 

General references

External links 
 
 

Lists of American reality television series episodes
Pawn Stars
Lists of American non-fiction television series episodes